The 1957–58 Spartan League season was the 40th in the history of Spartan League. The league consisted of 16 teams.

League table

The division featured 16 teams, 14 from last season and 2 new teams:
 Boreham Wood, from Parthenon League
 Rayners Lane, from Parthenon League

References

1957-58
9